Orphans: Brawlers, Bawlers & Bastards is a limited edition three CD set by Tom Waits, released by the ANTI- label on November 17, 2006 in Europe and on November 21, 2006 in the United States.

The album is divided into three sections, with each disc being a separate collection in its own. It borrows from Tom Waits’s rock sound, with the first disc (Brawlers) being blues and rock-based, the second (Bawlers) centred on slow-tempo, melancholic ballads, and the third (Bastards) on more experimental compositions. Additionally, the record contains influences of other genres, including folk, gospel, jazz and roots music. Orphans: Brawlers, Bawlers and Bastards received universal acclaim from critics, who lauded its experimentation and composition, as well as Waits's vocals. It was listed as one of the highest-scoring albums of the year in Metacritic, and was nominated for a Grammy Award for Best Contemporary Folk Album. Furthermore, it was a fair commercial success, charting in the United States Billboard 200, as well as in Australia, Switzerland and Austria, reaching the top twenty in the latter.

The Orphans Tour was conducted in support of the album prior to its release.

Background 
The set is a collection of 26 rare and 30 brand new songs (there are two hidden tracks on disc 3). Each disc is intended to be a separate collection in itself; the first disc with the more roughcut rock and blues cuts, the second the more melancholy tunes and ballads, and the third disc having the more experimental songs and spoken word pieces. The liner notes claim there are "56 songs, of which 30 are new". Waits has described the collection as

Subdivision into three albums
On the decision to organize the songs into three themed albums, under the titles Brawlers, Bawlers and Bastards, Waits said in interview: 

Brawlers, the most rock and blues-oriented of the three collections, contains songs covering themes ranging from failed relationships ("Lie to Me", "Walk Away"), floods and subsequent havoc ("2:19"), and a song about the Israeli–Palestinian conflict ("Road to Peace"); and incorporates musical styles such as bluesy gospel ("Ain't Goin' Down to the Well", "Lord I've Been Changed"), sentimental tunes ("Sea of Love"), and grim story-songs ("Lucinda").

Bawlers is composed of mostly downbeat numbers, replacing the hope of ballads on previous albums with resignation (notably "Bend Down the Branches", "Little Drop of Poison", "Fannin Street", "Little Man", and "Widow's Grove"). The track "Down There by the Train" was written by Waits for Johnny Cash, and was first released on Cash's first American Recordings album. Waits claims to have originally intended to call this part of the compilation Shut Up and Eat Your Ballads.

Bastards is concerned with Waits's more experimental musical styles, opening with an adaptation of Bertolt Brecht's poem "What Keeps Mankind Alive?" (music by Kurt Weill) and continuing on "Children's Story", which is an excerpt of Robert Wilson's production of Georg Büchner's unfinished 1837 play Woyzeck, the score of which Waits wrote and later released as his Blood Money album. The disc contains other literary adaptations, including a Charles Bukowski poem about enlightenment ("Nirvana") and two songs, "Home I'll Never Be" and "On the Road", originally penned by Jack Kerouac.

Reception

Critical 

The album was released to highly positive reviews, scoring 92 out of 100 on aggregator Metacritic, indicating "universal acclaim". It ranked second on Metacritic's Top 30 albums of 2006, just behind Savane by Ali Farka Toure, and was nominated for the 2006 Shortlist Music Prize and the 2007 Grammy Award for Best Contemporary Folk Album.

Jimmy Newlin of Slant Magazine gave the record a favourable review, awarding it five out of five stars. While writing that "Orphans isn't as cohesive a release as Waits's albums usually are", he went on to say that "even Waits's missteps still manage to point in the right direction". Chris Power of BBC gave the album a four-and-a-half out of five points, asserting that "Tom Waits can lay claim to one of the most fecund artistic imaginations in America", calling the album "Essential listening". Sylvie Simmons of The Guardian wrote that the album's three separate discs "make up one very powerful entry", and called the record "Great", giving it a four out of a possible five points.
Teresa Nieman of Prefix Magazine additionally gave it a positive review, comparing it to "taking a journey through a familiar yet entirely foreign dream-place", and claimed that "Orphans is an experience of the most memorable kind". In a Punknews.org review, the album was given four-and-a-half out of five stars, said to contain a "brilliant collection" of songs; the tracks have been described as "sonically cohesive and could pass as one very long recording session, laced over with the light coat of fuzz."

Furthermore, the album was well received by Jeff Vabrel of PopMatters, who gave it a nine out of ten stars; he affirmed that it was "One of his most skilful-ever blends of beauty and horror", also claiming that Waits's "world [...] is considerably more inviting and rewarding".
Keith Phipps of The A.V. Club gave the album an A− as well as a favourable review, writing that "for a collection of leftovers gathered from hither and yon, they hang remarkably well together", and wrote that "many of them rank among Waits's best output". Furthermore, Audra Schroeder of the Austin Chronicle gave the album a three out of five points, and a moderately positive review, calling it a "seamless lot" which turns out to be a "bona fide gem of a collection". Stylus gave the album a B+, writing that the "tripartite typology works like a Waitsian Rorschach test: blurred, suggestive, and revealing", and while saying that the album may not have "something for everyone [...] what's missing says more about the listener than the record". Critic Robert Christgau gave the album an A grade.

Commercial 
The album was certified Gold by the RIAA for shipping over 500,000 copies in the United States and sold over one million copies worldwide making it his best-selling album to date. It was awarded a diamond certification from the Independent Music Companies Association which indicated sales of at least 250,000 copies throughout Europe.

Alternate editions
Some copies of the initial "limited edition" are autographed by Waits.

A limited number of other copies came with a special vinyl single, including the songs "Lie to Me" and "Crazy 'Bout My Baby".

A 7-disc vinyl box set of the album was released on December 8, 2009. This set contains six additional tracks not found on the CD version.

Track listing

CD
All songs by Tom Waits and Kathleen Brennan, except where otherwise noted.

Disc one: Brawlers
 "Lie to Me" – 2:10
 "LowDown" – 4:15
 "2:19" – 5:02
 Appears on the Waits-produced John P. Hammond recording Wicked Grin (2001)
 "Fish in the Jailhouse" – 4:22
 "Bottom of the World" – 5:42
 Appears in the 2003 documentary film Long Gone
 "Lucinda" – 4:52
 "Ain't Goin' Down to the Well" (Lead Belly, John Lomax, Alan Lomax) – 2:28
 "Lord I've Been Changed" (Traditional; arranged by Waits and Brennan) – 2:28
 Appears on the Waits-produced John P. Hammond recording Wicked Grin as "I Know I've Been Changed" (2001)
 "Puttin' on the Dog" – 3:39
 Appears in the 1999 comedy-drama film Liberty Heights
 "Road to Peace" – 7:17
 "All the Time" – 4:33
 "The Return of Jackie and Judy" (Joey Ramone, Johnny Ramone, Dee Dee Ramone) – 3:28
 Previously released on the Ramones tribute album We're a Happy Family (2003)
 "Walk Away" – 2:43
 Previously released on the Dead Man Walking soundtrack recording (1996)
 "Sea of Love" (Phil Phillips, George Khoury) – 3:43
 Previously released on the Sea of Love soundtrack recording (1989)
 "Buzz Fledderjohn" – 4:12
 Previously released on the "Hold On" single (1999)
 "Rains on Me" (Waits, Chuck E. Weiss) – 3:20
 Previously released on Chuck E. Weiss' 1999 Extremely Cool, then on Free the West Memphis 3 in 2000.  This is the latter version.

Disc two: Bawlers
 "Bend Down the Branches" – 1:06
 Previously released on For the Kids (2002), an album featuring renditions of children's songs by various artists
 "You Can Never Hold Back Spring" – 2:26
 Originally appeared in the 2005 Roberto Benigni film The Tiger and the Snow.
 "Long Way Home" – 3:10
 Previously released on the Big Bad Love soundtrack recording (2001)
 (Covered by Norah Jones, on her 2004 album Feels like Home)
 "Widow's Grove" – 4:58
 "Little Drop of Poison" – 3:09
 Previously released on The End of Violence and Shrek 2 soundtrack recordings. The "End of Violence" version differs from this, which is the Shrek 2 version.
 "Shiny Things" – 2:20
 Appears in Robert Wilson's production of Georg Büchner's unfinished 1837 play Woyzeck, but not included in the 2002 studio album of the score, Blood Money
 "World Keeps Turning" – 4:16
 Previously released on the Pollock (2001) soundtrack recording
 "Tell It to Me" – 3:08
 Previously recorded as a duet with Ramblin' Jack Elliot as "Louise (Tell It To Me)" (from Elliot's Friends of Mine). This version differs from the original with Elliot's absence, and a change in time signature.
 "Never Let Go" – 3:13
 Previously appeared on the soundtrack for the 1992 Martin Bell film American Heart.
 "Fannin Street" – 5:01
 Appears on the Waits-produced John P. Hammond recording Wicked Grin (2001) performed by John Hammond.  This version is by Waits.
 An homage to Lead Belly, who had a song titled Fannin Street (Mister Tom Hughes' Town)
 "Little Man" (Teddy Edwards) – 4:33
 Previously released on Mississippi Lad, an album by Teddy Edwards released in 1991 on the Verve Label
 "It's Over" – 4:40
 Previously appeared in a different take on the soundtrack to the 1999 film Liberty Heights.
 Appears in Robert Wilson's production of Georg Büchner's unfinished 1837 play Woyzeck, but not included in the 2002 studio album of the score, Blood Money
 "If I Have to Go" – 2:15
 Originally from Waits's 1986 theatre play Franks Wild Years, although not released on the studio album of the same name. The theme from the song was used under the title "Rat's Theme" in the 1984 documentary film Streetwise.
 "Goodnight Irene" (Lead Belly, Gussie L. Davis) – 4:47
 "The Fall of Troy" – 3:01
 Previously released on the Dead Man Walking soundtrack recording (1996)
 "Take Care of All My Children" – 2:31
 Appears in the 1984 documentary film Streetwise
 "Down There by the Train" – 5:39
 Song appears on the Johnny Cash album American Recordings (1994) performed by Cash. This version appears in the 2003 documentary film Long Gone.
 "Danny Says" (Joey Ramone, Johnny Ramone, Dee Dee Ramone) – 3:05
 "Jayne's Blue Wish" – 2:29
 Previously released on the Big Bad Love soundtrack recording (2002)
 "Young at Heart" (Carolyn Leigh, Johnny Richards) – 3:41

Disc three: Bastards
 "What Keeps Mankind Alive?" (Kurt Weill, Bertolt Brecht; translated by John Willett) – 2:09
 From the Threepenny Opera
 Previously released on the various-artists Weill tribute album Lost in the Stars: The Music of Kurt Weill (1985)
 "Children's Story" – 1:42
 Based on Georg Büchner's Woyzeck (public domain)
 "Heigh Ho" (Frank Churchill, Larry Morey) – 3:32
 From the 1937 Walt Disney film Snow White And the Seven Dwarfs, sung by the seven dwarfs
 Previously released on the various-artists Disney tribute album Stay Awake: Various Interpretations of Music from Vintage Disney Films (1988)
 "Army Ants" – 3:25
 "Books of Moses" (Skip Spence) – 2:49
 Previously released on More Oar, a 1999 various-artists tribute to Spence and his solo album Oar.
 "Bone Chain" – 1:03
 "Two Sisters" (Traditional; arranged by Waits and Brennan) – 4:55
 "First Kiss" – 2:40
 "Dog Door" (Waits, Brennan, Mark Linkous) – 2:43
 With Sparklehorse; previously released on the Sparklehorse album It's a Wonderful Life (2001)
 "Redrum" – 1:12
 "Nirvana" – 2:12
 Words: Charles Bukowski
 "Home I'll Never Be" – 2:28
 Words: Jack Kerouac
 "Poor Little Lamb" (William J. Kennedy, Waits) – 1:43
 "Altar Boy" – 2:48
 Originally written for Alice; an earlier version can be found on The Alice Demos, under the title "What Became Of Old Father Craft?"
 "The Pontiac" – 1:54
 Originally released on the 1987 spoken word compilation Smack My Crack
 "Spidey's Wild Ride" – 2:03
 "King Kong" (Daniel Johnston) – 5:29
 Previously released on the Johnston tribute album The Late Great Daniel Johnston: Discovered Covered (2004)
 "On the Road" – 4:14
 Words: Jack Kerouac.  Originally appeared on the 1999 album Jack Kerouac Reads On the Road.
 "Dog Treat" (Hidden track) – 2:56
 Live recording
 "Missing My Son" (Hidden track) – 3:38

Vinyl

LPs one and two: Brawlers

Side A:
 "Lie to Me" – 2:10
 "LowDown" – 4:15
 "2:19" – 5:02
 "Fish in the Jailhouse" – 4:22

Side B:
 "Bottom of the World" – 5:42
 "Lucinda" – 4:52
 "Ain't Goin' Down to the Well" – 2:28
 "Lord I've Been Changed" – 2:28

Side C:
 "Puttin' on the Dog" – 3:39
 "Road to Peace" – 7:17
 "All the Time" – 4:33

Side D:
 "The Return of Jackie and Judy" – 3:28
 "Walk Away" – 2:43
 "Sea of Love" – 3:43
 "Buzz Fledderjohn" – 4:12
 "Rains on Me" – 3:20

LPs three and four: Bawlers

Side A:
 "Bend Down the Branches" – 1:06
 "You Can Never Hold Back Spring" – 2:26
 "Long Way Home" – 3:10
 "Widow's Grove" – 4:58
 "Little Drop of Poison" – 3:09
 "Shiny Things" – 2:20

Side B:
 "World Keeps Turning" – 4:16
 "Tell It to Me" – 3:08
 "Never Let Go" – 3:13
 "Fannin Street" – 5:01

Side C:
 "Little Man" – 4:33
 "It's Over" – 4:40
 "If I Have to Go" – 2:15
 "Goodnight Irene" – 4:47
 "The Fall of Troy" – 3:01

Side D:
 "Take Care of All My Children" – 2:31
 "Down There By the Train" – 5:39
 "Danny Says" – 3:05
 "Jayne's Blue Wish" – 2:29
 "Young at Heart" – 3:41

LPs five and six: Bastards

Side A:
 "What Keeps Mankind Alive" – 2:09
 "Children's Story" – 1:42
 "Heigh Ho" – 3:32
 "Army Ants" – 3:25
 "Books of Moses" – 2:49

Side B:
 "Bone Chain" – 1:03
 "Two Sisters" – 4:55
 "First Kiss" – 2:40
 "Dog Door" – 2:43
 "Redrum" – 1:12

Side C:
 "Nirvana" – 2:12
 "Home I'll Never Be" – 2:28
 "Poor Little Lamb" – 1:43
 "Altar Boy" – 2:48
 "The Pontiac" – 1:54
 "Spidey's Wild Ride" – 2:03

Side D:
 "King Kong" – 5:29
 "On the Road" – 4:14
 "Dog Treat" – 2:56
 "Missing My Son" – 3:38

LP seven: Bonus
Side A:
 "Crazy 'Bout My Baby" (Fats Waller) – 2:04
 "Diamond in Your Mind" – 5:08
 Appears in Robert Wilson's production of Georg Büchner's unfinished 1837 play Woyzeck, but not included in the 2002 studio album of the score, Blood Money
 "Cannon Song" (Kurt Weill) – 2:59
 From the Threepenny Opera

Side B:
 "Pray" – 2:59
 "No One Can Forgive Me" – 4:56
 Outtake from Bone Machine (1992)
 "Mathie Grove" – 6:31
 Traditional; arranged by Waits

Personnel

 Tom Waits – vocals, guitar, pump organ, keyboards, percussion
 Dave Alvin – guitar
 Anges Amar – whistles
 Ara Anderson – trumpet
 Ray Armando – percussion
 Bobby Baloo – cowbells, boulders
 Bobby Black – steel guitar
 Michael Blair – drums, percussion
 Andrew Borger – percussion
 Brain – percussion
 Matt Brubeck – bass
 Dan Cantrell – accordion
 Ralph Carney – saxophone
 Crispin Cioe – saxophone
 Bent Clausen – banjo, piano
 Les Claypool – bass
 Jimmy Cleveland – trombone
 Harry K. Cody – banjo
 Greg Cohen – bass
 Eddie Davis – banjo
 Darrel Devore – circular violin
 Seth Ford-Young – bass
 Steve Foreman – percussion
 Mitchell Froom – chamberlin
 Bob Funk – trombone
 Joe Gore – guitar
 Chris Grady – trumpet
 Brett Gurewitz – guitar
 Ron Hacker – guitar
 John Hammond – harmonica
 Arno Hecht – saxophone
 Billy Higgins – drums
 Art Hillery – piano
 Stephen Hodges – percussion
 Bart Hopkin – bamboo clarinet
 Trevor Horn – bass
 Carla Kihlstedt – violin
 Guy Klucevsek – accordion
 Gary Knowlton – keyboards
 Mike Knowlton – guitar
 Larry LaLonde – guitar
 Adam Lane – bass
 Mark Linkous – guitar, bass, drums
 Paul "Hollywood" Litteral – trumpet
 Charlie Musselwhite – harmonica
 Tom Nunn – The Bug
 Eric Perney – bass
 Nic Phelps – horns
 Dan Plonsey – clarinet
 Steve Prutsman – piano
 Marc Ribot – guitar
 Bebe Risenfors – clarinet
 Gino Robair – percussion
 Mike Silverman – bass
 Jeff Sloan – percussion
 Nolan Smith – trumpet
 Matthew Sperry – bass
 Colin Stetson – saxophone
 Larry Taylor – bass
 Francis Thumm – piano
 Leroy Vinnegar – bass
 Casey Waits – drums
 Sullivan Waits – guitar
 Richard Waters – waterphone
 Tom Yoder – trombone

Charts and certifications

Weekly charts

Year-end charts

Certifications

References

External links
 ANTI.com information page
 Tom Waits Library – Lyrics and information on all of the songs on Orphans

Tom Waits albums
2006 albums
Anti- (record label) albums
2006 compilation albums
Tom Waits compilation albums
Anti- (record label) compilation albums